Oleh Zhurka (born 4 November 1977, Ukrainian SSR) is a Ukrainian footballer currently under contract for Moldovan side FC Iskra-Stal Rîbniţa.

External links
Profile at moldova.sports.md
Profile at Official FFU Site (Ukr)

1977 births
Living people
Ukrainian footballers
Ukrainian expatriate footballers
Expatriate footballers in Moldova
Association football defenders
FC Podillya Khmelnytskyi players
FC Naftovyk-Ukrnafta Okhtyrka players
FC Oleksandriya players
FC Obolon-Brovar Kyiv players
FC Hoverla Uzhhorod players
FC Nyva Vinnytsia players